Kadjéma, also spelled Kadjemah, is a village located in Haut-Mbomou Prefecture, Central African Republic.

History 
On 27 September 2009, LRA bands attacked Kadjema and killed one person. In December 2009, LRA fighters invaded Kadjéma and abducted five people.

On 14 June 2016, LRA raided Kadjéma. They kidnapped 17 people and looted the civilians' properties. A year later, on 18 August 2017, LRA attacked Kadjéma. The militias abducted six people and looted the health center.

Facility 
Kadjéma has one health post.

References 

Populated places in Haut-Mbomou